Island of Love may refer to:

"Island of Love", a song from the Elvis Presley album Blue Hawaii 
Island of Love, the English-language name for Galešnjak in Croatia

Film
 Island of Love (1929 film), French film directed by Berthe Dagmar and Jean Durand
 The Island of Love, 1944 French film
 Island of Love (1963 film), American film directed by Morton DaCosta

See also
Love Island (disambiguation)